Marc Schiechl  (born November 30, 1987) is an arena football linebacker who is currently a free agent. He was most recently a member of the Hamilton Tiger-Cats of the Canadian Football League. He was signed by the Jacksonville Jaguars as an undrafted free agent in 2011. He played college football at The Colorado School of Mines.

External links
 Colorado School of Mines Bio
 Jacksonville Jaguars Bio

1987 births
Living people
People from Lakewood, Colorado
Players of American football from Colorado
American football defensive ends
Colorado Mines Orediggers football players
Jacksonville Jaguars players
Hamilton Tiger-Cats players
Spokane Shock players
Los Angeles Kiss players
San Jose SaberCats players
Sportspeople from the Denver metropolitan area